Breviceps adspersus, also known as common rain frog, bushveld rain frog, and many other vernacular names, is a species of frog in the family Brevicipitidae. It is found in Southern Africa, in Angola, Democratic Republic of the Congo, 
Namibia, Botswana, Zambia, Zimbabwe, South Africa, Eswatini, and Mozambique.

Description

The common rain frog lives underground, only emerging to feed and mate after a rain, usually at nighttime. Its body is stout and globular, with a  grumpy face. The color of this species is either day or night brown, with rows of lighter tan orange patches, with blue borders. It also has the short, stout limbs typical of most burrowing frogs and toads. However, its back feet are like spades and are able to dig up to 20 inches below underground. If attacked, the frog inflates and lodges itself firmly inside of the burrow. Common rain frogs are known to walk instead of hop. The females are also much larger than males. Since the male cannot grip the female during mating because of the size difference, the female secretes a kind of glue from her back to keep the mating pair together. The stuck-together pair burrow backwards into the soil until they reach a moist spot. Once a suitable spot is reached, the female lays her eggs. The eggs hatch directly into froglets instead of tadpoles. They are 1½ to 2¼ inches long (3 to 6 centimeters).
While the concern for these frogs are low, continuous habitat loss within its native region poses a major threat to their well-being and long term survival.

The common rain frog inhabits temperate forests and open grasslands of southeast Africa. They are a terrestrial species. These frogs only breed in the rainy season. The population of this species is stable, and listed as "locally common".

Diet
The common rain frog eats insects and termites. Babies often eat caterpillars. First, the adult smacks the bug's head, and this is called dapping. Then they locate the insect. After locating, they use their sticky tongues to lap up the insect.

References

Breviceps
Frogs of Africa
Amphibians of Angola
Amphibians of Botswana
Amphibians of Eswatini
Amphibians of Mozambique
Amphibians of Namibia
Amphibians of South Africa
Amphibians of Zambia
Amphibians of Zimbabwe
Taxa named by Wilhelm Peters
Amphibians described in 1882
Taxonomy articles created by Polbot